Theodore Joseph Jones III (September 19, 1984 – October 29, 2018), better known by his stage name Young Greatness, was an American rapper. He was best known for his 2015 single "Moolah", which peaked at number 85 on the Billboard Hot 100 chart.  He was shot and killed in October 2018.

Early life
Jones was born on September 19, 1984, in New Orleans, Louisiana. He moved to Houston after Hurricane Katrina. He grew up listening to Juvenile, Jay-Z and Biggie Smalls.

Career
Taking the stage name Young Greatness, he began attracting notice from Houston rappers such as Bun B and Mike Jones, resulting in a deal with the record label Quality Control Music and Motown in 2015. In November 2015, he released the single "Moolah", which peaked at number 85 on the US Billboard Hot 100. In March 2016, Rolling Stone included Greatness in their list of "10 New Artists You Need to Know". In July 2016, Greatness performed "Moolah" on The Late Show with Stephen Colbert.

Death
On October 29, 2018, Jones was shot outside a Waffle House located at Elysian Fields Avenue in New Orleans. He was pronounced dead at 34 years old.

Discography

Mixtapes

Singles

See also
List of murdered hip hop musicians

References

1984 births
2018 deaths
African-American male rappers
Musicians from New Orleans
Rappers from New Orleans
Musicians from Houston
Deaths by firearm in Louisiana
People murdered in Louisiana
20th-century African-American people
21st-century African-American people